The State Darwin Museum is a natural history museum in Moscow. The museum was founded in 1907 by Alexander Kohts (1880–1964) and was the world's first museum of evolution explaining the work of Charles Darwin as a causal explanation of nature.

References

External links

 Official site
 State Darwin Museum at Google Cultural Institute

Museums in Moscow
Natural history museums in Russia